Norman Foster (born Norman Foster Hoeffer, December 13, 1903 – July 7, 1976) was an American film director, screenwriter and actor. He directed many Charlie Chan and Mr. Moto films as well as projects for Orson Welles and Walt Disney. As an actor he was a leading man in early talkies and also appeared in Welles' final film The Other Side of the Wind.

Life and career
Norman Foster was born Norman Foster Hoeffer on December 13, 1903, in Richmond, Indiana. He became a cub reporter on a local newspaper in Indiana before going to New York in the hopes of getting a better newspaper job but there were no vacancies.

He tried a number of theatrical agencies before getting stage work including The Barker (1927, New York; 1928, London) in which he appeared opposite Claudette Colbert. He later appeared on Broadway in the George S. Kaufman/Ring Lardner play June Moon in 1929. He began working in crowd scenes in films before moving to bigger parts.

Foster wrote several plays. He gave up acting in the late 1930s to pursue directing, although he occasionally appeared in movies and television programs. Foster directed a number of Charlie Chan and Mr. Moto mysteries, including Charlie Chan in Panama (1940), Charlie Chan at Treasure Island (1939), Mr. Moto Takes a Vacation (1939), Charlie Chan in Reno (1939), Mr. Moto's Last Warning (1939), Mysterious Mr. Moto (1938), Mr. Moto Takes a Chance (1938), Thank You, Mr. Moto (1937), and Think Fast, Mr. Moto (1937). He co-wrote and directed the "My Friend Bonito" segment of Orson Welles's unfinished Pan-American anthology film It's All True (1941). Initially engaged as a second-unit director who would film background material, Foster came to do much more and the quality of his work would have been recognized with a co-director credit on the film. A co-production of RKO Pictures and the Office of the Coordinator of Inter-American Affairs, the non-commercial project was later terminated by RKO.

As Welles prepared to go to Brazil to film the Rio Carnival for It's All True, he temporarily suspended "Bonito" (for which filming was never completed) so Foster could return to Hollywood to direct Journey into Fear (1943). Welles played a small on-screen role in the Mercury Production, and denied that he took over direction of the film himself.

Some of Foster's other directorial efforts include Kiss the Blood off My Hands (1948), Rachel and the Stranger (1948), Woman on the Run (1950) and The Sign of Zorro (1958). He directed the Davy Crockett segments of the Walt Disney anthology television series Disneyland that were edited into the feature films Davy Crockett, King of the Wild Frontier (1955) and Davy Crockett and the River Pirates (1956). Foster's second verse of his lyrics to Disney's Zorro theme song which was "He is polite, but the wicked take flight, when they catch the sight of Zorro. He's friend of the weak, and the poor, and the meek, this very unique Senor Zorro." never aired on the television series. This version of the Zorro Theme including these verses was performed by The Chordettes. These verses later appeared in the Disney Sing-Along Songs version of the Zorro Theme in its 1987 direct-to-video episode, "Heigh-Ho".

Personal life
In 1928, Foster secretly married Claudette Colbert in London. Concerned about the reaction of Colbert's mother to their union, they continued to keep their marriage a secret from her, even to the point of living apart. Nevertheless, in 1935 they divorced, and Foster in October that same year married actress Sally Blane, an older sister of actress Loretta Young. They had their first child, Gretchen (Loretta Young's birth name), who was born in June 1936. They also had a son, Robert.

Death
Norman Foster died on July 7, 1976 in Santa Monica, California. He was 72. He was buried in Holy Cross Cemetery, Culver City, California, beside his beloved wife Sally Blane, who died in 1997.

Theatre credits

Film and television credits

Actor

Director

References

External links

1903 births
1976 deaths
20th-century American male actors
Male actors from Indiana
American male film actors
Deaths from cancer in California
People from Richmond, Indiana
Burials at Holy Cross Cemetery, Culver City
Film directors from Indiana
Journalists from Indiana
20th-century American journalists
American male journalists